The India cricket team toured New Zealand in January and February 2019 to play five One Day Internationals (ODIs) and three Twenty20 International (T20I) matches. The ODI fixtures were part of both teams' preparation for the 2019 Cricket World Cup, with India winning the series 4–1. The T20I matches took place on the same day as the corresponding women's fixtures at the same venues. New Zealand won the T20I series 2–1, and ended India's run of ten T20I series without defeat. It was the first time that India had lost a T20I bilateral series of three or more matches.

Squads

Jasprit Bumrah was rested from the tour and replaced by Mohammed Siraj in India's squad for both the ODI and T20I fixtures. Siddarth Kaul was added to India's squad for the T20I series.

On 11 January 2019, Hardik Pandya and KL Rahul were suspended by the Board of Control for Cricket in India (BCCI) following controversial comments they made on the Indian talk show Koffee with Karan earlier in the month. They were ruled out of the ODI series against Australia, and all of the fixtures on this tour. Vijay Shankar and Shubman Gill were called up as their replacements. Virat Kohli was rested for the last two ODIs and the T20I series, with Rohit Sharma named as captain of the India team in his place. On 24 January, after lifting the suspension on Pandya and Rahul, the BCCI announced that Pandya would re-join the squad for the matches in New Zealand.

James Neesham and Todd Astle were added to New Zealand's squad for the last two ODIs, replacing Doug Bracewell and Ish Sodhi respectively. Martin Guptill was ruled out of New Zealand's T20I squad due to injury and was replaced by James Neesham.

ODI series

1st ODI

2nd ODI

3rd ODI

4th ODI

5th ODI

T20I series

1st T20I

2nd T20I

3rd T20I

Notes

References

External links
 Series home at ESPN Cricinfo

2019 in New Zealand cricket
2019 in Indian cricket
International cricket competitions in 2018–19
Indian cricket tours of New Zealand